Sony released the following A-mount cameras since 2006. They are all part of the Sony α system.

List of Sony A-mount cameras:

See also
List of Konica Minolta A-mount cameras
List of Minolta A-mount cameras
List of Konica Minolta A-mount lenses
List of Minolta A-mount lenses
List of Sony α cameras
List of Sony E-mount cameras
List of Sony A-mount lenses

References